The ANEC IV Missel Thrush was a 1920s British two-seat light aircraft built by Air Navigation and Engineering Company Limited at Addlestone Surrey.

History
The ANEC IV biplane was designed by John Bewsher for the 1926 Lympne light aircraft trial for two seaters fitted with engines of less than 170 lb.  It did not make the competition as the undercarriage collapsed in a taxiing accident. In 1927 the only aircraft built (registered G-EBPI) was sold to a private owner who replaced the original Blackburne Thrush radial engine with an Armstrong Siddeley Genet II engine. The owner was killed and the aircraft destroyed while competing in the 1928 King's Cup Race.

Operators
: Private owners

Specifications (ANEC IV)

References

External links

 

1920s British civil utility aircraft
Single-engined tractor aircraft
4
Biplanes
Aircraft first flown in 1926